Two Blondes and a Redhead is a 1947 American musical film directed by Arthur Dreifuss and starring Jean Porter.

Plot

Cast

Production
The film was originally known as Three Blondes and a Redhead.

Filming started April 1947.

References

External links

Two Blondes and a Redhead at IMDb

1947 films
Columbia Pictures films
American musical films
1947 musical films
American black-and-white films
Films directed by Arthur Dreifuss
1940s American films
1940s English-language films